South Wales Central is an electoral region of the Senedd, consisting of eight constituencies. The region elects 12 members, eight directly elected constituency members and four additional members. The electoral region was first used in 1999, when the National Assembly for Wales was created.

Each constituency elects one Member of the Senedd (MSs) by the first past the post electoral system, and the region as a whole elects four additional or top-up  MSs, to create a degree of proportional representation. The additional member seats are allocated from closed lists by the D'Hondt method, with constituency results reckoned as pre elected list members.

County boundaries

The region covers much of the preserved county of Mid Glamorgan and much of the preserved county of South Glamorgan. The rest of Mid Glamorgan is partly within the South Wales East electoral region and partly within South Wales West. The rest of South Glamorgan is within the South Wales West electoral region.

Electoral region profile
The region is predominantly urban, taking in Wales' capital and largest city, Cardiff, as well as the working-class former mining town of Pontypridd, the seaside resort of Barry, and parts of the formerly industrial and still heavily populated South Wales Valleys. However, the region also includes rural areas in the western part of the Vale of Glamorgan.

Constituencies
The eight constituencies have the names and boundaries of constituencies of the House of Commons of the Parliament of the United Kingdom (Westminster):

Assembly members and Members of the Senedd

Constituency MSs

Regional list AMs and MSs

N.B. This table is for presentation purposes only

2021 Senedd election

2021 Senedd election additional members

Regional MSs elected in 2021

2016 Welsh Assembly election additional members

Regional AMs elected in 2016

2011 Welsh Assembly election additional members

Regional AMs elected in 2011

† Replaced John Dixon, who was disqualified for being a member of a public body to which AMs cannot belong.

2007 Welsh Assembly election additional members

2003 Welsh Assembly election additional members

1999 Welsh Assembly election additional members

Notes

Senedd electoral regions